Carabus torosus is a species of black-coloured ground beetle in the  Carabinae subfamily that can be found in Bulgaria, European part of Turkey, and Near East.

Subspecies
Carabus torosus rigouti Basquin & Darge, 1986
Carabus torosus salignus Schweiger, 1969
Carabus torosus spinolae Cristoforis & Jan, 1837
Carabus torosus vexator Schweiger, 1969

References

torosus
Beetles described in 1835
Beetles of Europe